128 (one hundred [and] twenty-eight) is the natural number following 127 and preceding 129.

In mathematics
128 is the seventh power of 2. It is the largest number which cannot be expressed as the sum of any number of distinct squares. However, it is divisible by the total number of its divisors, making it a refactorable number.

The sum of Euler's totient function φ() over the first twenty integers is 128.

128 can be expressed by a combination of its digits with mathematical operators, thus 128  28 − 1, making it a Friedman number in base 10.

A hepteract has 128 vertices.

128 is the only 3-digit number that is a 7th power (27).

In bar codes
 Code 128 is a Uniform Symbology Specification (USS Code 128) alphanumeric bar code that encodes text, numbers, numerous functions, and designed to encode all 128 ASCII characters (ASCII 0 to ASCII 127), as used in the shipping industry.
 Subdivisions include:
 128A (0–9, A–Z, ASCII control codes, special characters)
 128B (0–9, A–Z, a–z, special characters)
 128C (00–99 numeric characters)
 GS1-128 application standard of the GS1 implementation using the Code 128 barcode specification
 ISBT 128 system for blood product labeling for the International Society of Blood Transfusion

In computing
 128-bit key size encryption for secure communications over the Internet
 IPv6 uses 128-bit (16-byte) addresses
 Any bit with a binary prefix is 128 bytes of a lesser binary prefix value, such as 1 gibibit is 128 mebibytes
 128-bit integers, memory addresses, or other data units are those that are at most 128 bits 16 octets wide

 Seven-segment displays have 128 possible states. 
 ASCII includes definitions for 128 characters (33 non-printing characters, mostly obsolete control characters that affect how text is processed, and 94 printable)
 A 128-bit integer can represent up to 3.40282366...e+38 values (2128  340,282,366,920,938,463,463,374,607,431,768,211,456).
 CAST-128 is a block cipher used in a number of products, notably as the default cipher in some versions of GPG and PGP.
 Graphics cards have a 128-bit, 256-bit, or 512-bit data bus to memory.
 Atari 2600 consoles have 128 bytes of memory
 Sony's PlayStation 2 Emotion Engine CPU has two 128-bit vector units
 Macintosh 128K, the original Apple Macintosh personal computer released in 1984
 Laser 128, a clone of the Apple II released in 1984
 Commodore 128, a home/personal computer which had a 128 KB of memory released in 1985
 Enterprise 128 Zilog Z80, a home computer released in 1985
 Jane 128, a GUI-based integrated software package for the Commodore 128 personal computer released in 1985
 RIVA 128 (Real-time Interactive Video and Animation accelerator), one of the first consumer graphics chips to integrate 3D and video acceleration in 1997
 Super Mario 128, a cancelled Nintendo game, though many elements were included in Super Mario Galaxy and Pikmin

In the military
 , a United States Navy Mission Buenaventura-class fleet oilers during World War II
 , a United States Navy  during World War II
 , a United States Navy 
 , a United States Navy  during World War II
 , a United States Navy  which removed naval mines laid in the water

In transportation
 Fiat 128, a small car manufactured by Fiat from 1969 to 1985. 
 SEAT 128, a 2-door coupé version of the Fiat 128
 The BMW 128i convertible
 128 is the number of many roads, including Massachusetts Route 128, Boston's inner beltway.
 Route 128 Station is a stop on the Massachusetts Bay Transportation Authority Attleboro/Providence MBTA Commuter Rail line in Westwood, Massachusetts
 STS-128 was a Space Shuttle Discovery mission to the International Space Station in 2009

In other fields
One hundred [and] twenty-eight is also:
 The year AD 128 or 128 BC
 128 AH, a year in the Islamic calendar that corresponds to 745 – 746 CE
 128 Nemesis, a main-belt asteroid
 Ross 128, a red dwarf star, the eleventh closest star system to the Solar System
 128P/Shoemaker-Holt, a periodic comet in the Solar system
 The atomic number of unbioctium, an element yet to be discovered
 The number of musical instruments specified in General MIDI. Sometimes they are numbered 0 to 127 and sometimes they are numbered 1 to 128
 128 film, a film format
 Sonnet 128 by William Shakespeare
 In music, a hundred twenty-eighth note is a note played for 1/128 of the duration of a whole note
 The number of US fluid ounces in a US gallon

See also 
 128th (disambiguation)
 List of highways numbered 128
 United Nations Security Council Resolution 128

Notes

References

 Wells, D. The Penguin Dictionary of Curious and Interesting Numbers London: Penguin Group. (1987): 138

External links

Code 128 specification at OpenBarcode.org

Integers